Club Guy & Roni is an international dance company from Groningen in the Netherlands, led by choreographers Roni Haver and Guy Weizman. The company was founded in 2002.

The performances are characterized by collaborations with artists in music, film and theatre and are generally considered to be of modern nature. Club Guy & Roni makes productions that tour through Europe. Since 2009 the company is subsidized by the NFPK.

In 2018 Club Guy & Roni started the interdisciplinary movement called NITE together with Noord Nederlands Toneel + Asko|Schönberg + Slagwerk Den Haag.

Performances from 2005 
 2005 Language of Walls
 2007 Myrrh and Cinnamon
 2008 Poetic Disasters
 2009 Pinball and Grace
 2009 Desert Highway
 2009 Heelhuids & Halsoverkop (in collaboration with NNT)
 2010 FKK
 2010 Four Walls
 2010 Alpha Boys
 2010 Air Ways (in collaboration with Oldenburgisches Staatstheater)
 2011 Miraculous Wednesday (in collaboration with Oldenburgisches Staatstheater)
 2011 L'Histoire du Soldat (in Moskou)
 2012 Midnight Rising
 2012 Modern Love (film)
 2013 L’Histoire du Soldat
 2013 Romeo et Juliette  (in collaboration with Oldenburgisches Staatstheater)
 2013 CRASH (in collaboration with NNT)
 2013 Naked Lunch (in collaboration with Slagwerk Den Haag and Vocaallab) 
 2014 My Private Odyssey (in collaboration with tanzmainz, the VOLSAP foundation and the Tomoko Mukaiyama foundation) 
 2014 Gift for Infinity (RUG), production for the celebration of the  Rijksuniversiteit Groningen (in collaboration with Noord Nederlands Orkest, WERC Collective and media artist Jan Klug) 
 2015 Mechanical Ecstasy (in collaboration with Slagwerk Den Haag) 
 2015 Festival Classique, Hofvijverconcert Sparks (in collaboration with the Residentie Orkest and media artist Jan Klug) 
 2015 Phobia (in collaboration with EN-KNAP (SI) and Slagwerk Den Haag) 
 2015 Sneeuwwitje (in collaboration with NNT) 
 2016 Happiness, coproduction with Slagwerk Den Haag
 2017 Carrousel, coproduction Noord Nederlands Toneel, Club Guy & Roni, Asko|Schönbergs K[h]AOS
 2018 Salam, coproduction Noord Nederlands Toneel, Club Guy & Roni, Asko|Schönberg
 2018 Tetris Mon Amour, coproduction with Slagwerk Den Haag, music bij Thijs de vlieger (NOISIA)
 2019 Brave New World 2.0, NITE performance

Club Guy & Roni performs at various festivals, like Oerol, Noorderzon and De Parade, and has performed in the past at the American Jacob's Pillow Festival and the Grec Festival in Barcelona, Spain. Club Guy & Roni could also be seen throughout the years at festivals in Madric, Rome, Tallinn, Berlin, Marseille and Frankfurt.

International co-productions 
The choreographers Guy Weizman and Roni Haver also get invited by external parties to create collaborative performances. Since 2010, Haver and Weizman are considered 'artists in residence' at the Oldenburgisches State Theater en since then they have co-produced 'Alpha Boys (2010), 'Miraculous Wednesday' (2011) and Roméo and Juliette' (2013). In September 2014 they moved along with the artistic staff of Oldenburg to take up residency at the State Theatre in Mainz.

In addition, the choreographers have also been working together with the Moscow dance company Tsekh Contemporary Dance Centre since 2011 and have produced a Russian 'L'Histoire du Soldat’. In Tuscany and Belgrado, Club Guy & Roni has also done co-productions, as well as with the Gothenburg Ballet (Sweden), Schauspiel Kölln (Germany) and Carte Blanche (Norway).

The Club appeared internationally on the stages of Suzanne Dellal Center for Dance and Theater Tel Aviv, Théâtre National de Chaillot Paris, SIDance Korea, Jacob's Pillow Festival, The Göteborg Opera Sweden, New Baltic Dance Vilnius Lithuania, La Rose Des Vents Lille, Istanbul Theatre Festival, Bolzano Danza Italy, 1862 Shanghai, Lowlands Music Festival, Teatro Calderon Valladolid,  Jing'an Drama Valley Shanghai, Carlow Festival Ireland, Circe Platform Tbilisi Georgia, Tanz Karlsruhe Germany, Warsaw Poland, Moscow, St. Petersburg and many more. We co-produced and made productions with partners around the world including Royal Flemish Theatre (KVS) Brussels and Théâtre de Liège et DC&J Créations in Belgium, Carte Blanche in Norway, Staatstheater Hannover, Theater Oldenburg, Tanz Mainz, Stuttgart (Eric Gautier), Thalia Theater Hamburg in Germany, EnKnap in Slovenia, GöteborgOperandsDanskompani and Dramaten The Royal Dramatic Theatre in Sweden, Navdhara India Dance Theater in Mumbai India, Théâtre National de Strasbourg and Odéon - Théâtre de l’Europe, Comédie de Genève in Switzerland, HNK Croatian National Theatre in Zagreb, Emilia Romagna Teatro Fondazione in Italy and many more.

Awards 
 Russian Golden Mask National Theatre Award in the category Best Ballet Master/Best Choreographer for the in Russia produced version of ‘L’Histoire du Soldat’ (2013)
 The Swan for best dance production for 'Midnight Rising'. (2013)
 Igor Podsiadly: The Swan for best Dance Performance for 'Naked Lunch' (2014)

Nominations 
 Roni Haver: Silver Theater dance award for ‘Albert and Panja’ (2001)
 Roni Haver: The Swan for best Dance Performance for ‘Myrrh and Cinnamon’ (2005)
 VSCD Theatre Award for ‘Heelhuids en Halsoverkop’ (2009)
 The Swan in the category Best Dance Production for ‘Alpha Boys’ (2011)
 Russian Golden Mask National Theatre Award in the category Innovation/Best Production for the in Russia produced version of ‘L’Histoire du Soldat’ (2013)
 Dunja Jocic: The Swan for best Dance Performance for 'Midnight Rising' (2013)

Additional projects 
Since 2013, Club Guy & Roni takes in a new dance group every year under the name of Club Guy & Roni's Poetic Disasters Club. This is a platform for young dancers who are about to graduate or who have just graduated. With this project, Club Guy & Roni wants to create a platform for young dancers, so they can get acquainted with the dance world. 

In 2011 Club Guy & Roni initiated the 'Duizend Dansjes Festival', to raise money for the UMCG Cancer Research Fund in Groningen. Eventually, €15,140 were raised for the Fund.

Move it! is a participation project from 2011 in which Club Guy & Roni and the Noord Nederlands Orkest teach a group of youths a choreography based on orchestral work. 

Every year Club Guy & Roni organizes the Club Guy & Roni Weekend Break Festival, a festival full of dance, theatre, live music, film and art. Club Guy & Roni seek contact with young, local talents for the production of this festival. The first edition was in 2013 in the Grand Theatre in Groningen.

References

External links
Website Club Guy & Roni

Dance companies
2002 establishments in the Netherlands